Cyrus Packard Walbridge (July 20, 1849 – May 1, 1921) was the 28th mayor of St. Louis, Missouri, serving from 1893 to 1897.  He was also the unsuccessful Republican candidate for Governor of Missouri in the 1904 election.

References

External links

 Cyrus P. Walbridge at the St. Louis Public Library: St. Louis Mayors website.

1849 births
1921 deaths
Mayors of St. Louis
People from Madrid, New York